Have Yourself a Sweary Little Christmas is a Christmas-themed comedy album by the Amateur Transplants, released in 2010.

Production

The album was created by Adam Kay and Suman Biswas who became famous after their song "London underground" went viral in 2005, receiving several million views on YouTube. The duo began writing the songs for the album in 2009 and some of the songs from "Have yourself a sweary little Christmas" were played in live performances by the band throughout this year. These songs also appeared on their 2009 live album In Theatre, which hit number 1 in the itunes comedy chart. They later decided to write a full Christmas album, with intention to release it before Christmas Day 2010. They were successful in doing so and the  album parodied many famous Christmas songs including "A fairytale of New York" and "feed the world". The songs contain very coarse and often offensive language and lyrics, subsequently a bleeped version was released along with the album. Both versions are available on iTunes , Amazon , spotify and CD.

The album has not been available for streaming in the UK for the past 3 Christmas' on any streaming service.

Track listing

 "All I want for Christmas" (2:37)
 "Mucking around on Christmas eve" (1:53)
 "Once in every Carol Service" (0:33)
 "Christmas Number 12" (1:12)
 "It's the Most Wonderful Time of the Year" (2:17)
 "Stressful Christmas" (0:59)
 Joseph's song (2:07)
 "Swearytale of New York" (1:24)
 "Stop of canapes" (2:42)
 "Feed the Girls" (2:01)
 "All the Trimmings (Part 1)" (1:32)
 "All the Trimmings (Part 2)" (2:11)
 "Hallelujah" (8:52)

References

2010 albums
Amateur Transplants albums